Marallu-ye Jafarqoli Khanlu (also Romanized as Mārāllū-ye Ja‘farqolī Khānlū; also known as Mārāllū and Morālalū-ye Ja‘farqolī Khānlū) is a village in Angut-e Sharqi Rural District, Anguti District, Germi County, Ardabil Province, Iran. At the 2006 census, its population was 82, in 20 families.

References 

Tageo

Towns and villages in Germi County